Julia Lloyd (born 1950) is an English former cricketer who played as a batter. She appeared in two One Day Internationals for Young England at the 1973 World Cup. She scored 14 runs in the tournament at an average of 7.00. She played domestic cricket for East Anglia.

References

External links
 
 

Living people
Date of birth missing (living people)
Cricketers from Greater London
Young England women cricketers
East Anglia women cricketers
1950 births